This is a list of ancient epigraphy found in Serbia.

Inscriptions

Tabula Traiana inscription: a Roman memorial plaque from 1st century AD near Kladovo

IMP. CAESAR. DIVI. NERVAE. F
NERVA TRAIANVS. AVG. GERM
PONTIF MAXIMUS TRIB POT IIII
PATER PATRIAE COS III
MONTIBVUS EXCISI(s) ANCO(ni)BVS
SVBLAT(i)S VIA(m) F(ecit)

meaning: "Emperor Nerva son of the divine Nerva, Nerva Trajan, the Augustus, Germanicus, Pontifex Maximus, invested for the fourth time as Tribune, Father of the Fatherland, Consul for the third time, excavating mountain rocks and using wood beams has made this road."

Personal names
Daizinis, Daizo: Thracian personal name found in Belgrade and Kostolac

Unknown
Vinča symbols: undeciphered proto-writing dating to 6th century BC found at Vinča.

References

External link

epigraphy
Latin inscriptions
Thracian language
Inscriptions
Inscriptions